Frankfort Hill District No. 10 School is a historic one-room school building located at Frankfort Hill in Herkimer County, New York.  It was built in 1846, and is a -story, rectangular wood-frame building with board-and-batten siding and a steep gable roof.  It has a one-story, rear addition and rests on a new concrete and masonry foundation.  It remained in use as a school until 1956.

It was listed on the National Register of Historic Places in 2011.

References

One-room schoolhouses in New York (state)
School buildings on the National Register of Historic Places in New York (state)
School buildings completed in 1846
Schools in Herkimer County, New York
National Register of Historic Places in Herkimer County, New York